Daniel G. Fawcus (1858 – 1925) was an English professional football player and administrator active throughout Europe.

Career
Fawcus was a player of Italian club Genoa between 1898 and 1900, after being one of the original founders of the club in 1893. By 1901 Fawcus had become Genoa's president, and started a three-yearly competition called the Fawcus Cup.

References

1858 births
1925 deaths
English footballers
Genoa C.F.C. players
Association footballers not categorized by position